SkyDeck Music is a record label and print publisher. The label started in the United States in 2007 as Galloping Cow Records and has released albums by Seamus Blake, Luis Bonilla, Tim Hagans, Jazzgroove Mothership Orchestra, Donny McCaslin, Dick Oatts, Chris Potter, Alex Sipiagin, and Matt Wilson.

Awards and honors
The list of jazz artists for SkyDeck Music includes Alex Sipiagin, Chris Potter, Seamus Blake, Dick Oatts, Luis Bonilla, the Jazzgroove Mothership Orchestra, Boris Kozlov, Dave Kikoski, Jeff "Tain" Watts, Eric Harland and Matt Wilson.  SkyDeck's book 50 Years at The Village Vanguard: Thad Jones, Mel Lewis and the Vanguard Jazz Orchestra was praised by All About Jazz and Down Beat magazine.

Recordings and books
The SkyDeck catalog represents both audio recordings and books.

SkyDeck Recordings

SkyDeck Publishing

See also
 List of record labels

References

External links

Jazz record labels